Tiopronin, sold under the brand name Thiola, is a medication used to control the rate of cystine precipitation and excretion in the disease cystinuria.

A generic version of tiopronin is available in the United States as of April 2021. A generic version of the delayed-release version is also available.

Medical uses
Tiopronin is indicated, in combination with high fluid intake, alkali, and diet modification, for the prevention of cystine stone formation in people  and greater with severe homozygous cystinuria, who are not responsive to these measures alone.

Side effects
Tiopronin may present a variety of side effects, which are broadly similar to those of D-penicillamine and other compounds containing active sulfhydryl groups. Its pharmacokinetics have been studied.

Pharmacology

Mechanism of action 
Tiopronin works by reacting with urinary cysteine to form a more soluble, disulfide linked, tiopronin-cysteine complex.

Society and culture
In the U.S., the drug was marketed by Mission Pharmacal at $1.50 per pill, but in 2014 the rights were bought by Retrophin, owned by Martin Shkreli, and the price increased to $30 per pill for a 100 mg capsule.

In 2016 Imprimis Pharmaceuticals introduced a lower cost version marketed as a compounded drug.

Research 
It may also be used for Wilson's disease (an overload of copper in the body), and has also been investigated for the treatment of arthritis, though tiopronin is not an anti-inflammatory.

Tiopronin is also sometimes used as a stabilizing agent for metal nanoparticles. The thiol group binds to the nanoparticles, preventing coagulation.

References

External links 
 

Amino acid derivatives
Orphan drugs
Thiols
X